Eyton Butts was an Anglican priest in the 18th century.

The son of Robert Butts, Bishop of Norwich from 1733 to 1738, he was educated at Charterhouse and St Catharine's College, Cambridge. He was Dean of Cloyne from 1770 until his death in 1779.

Notes

Alumni of St Catharine's College, Cambridge
Deans of Cloyne
18th-century English Anglican priests
People educated at Charterhouse School
1779 deaths